"Angel by My Side" is the third single of Dutch singer Do off her debut album, Do.  The song was co-written by English songwriters Alistair Griffin and James and Tom Martin. It peaked at No. 10 on the Dutch singles chart.

It was used as the title song for the film Ellis in Glamourland.

Track listing
CD single
"Angel by My Side (single version)" 3.25
"Close to You" 4.20
"Ellis in Glamourland" (Trailer)

Charts

Weekly charts

Year-end charts

References

2004 songs
2004 singles
Do (singer) songs
Songs written by Alistair Griffin
Sony BMG singles